Hesychotypa turbida is a species of beetle in the family Cerambycidae. It was described by Henry Walter Bates in 1880. It is known from Panama, Costa Rica and Nicaragua.

References

turbida
Beetles described in 1880